The San Joaquin League was a high school athletic league that was part of the CIF Southern Section. It was dissolved after the 2013–14 season, most of the schools moving to the Santa Cruz League.

Former members
Former members of the league included:

 Eastside Christian High School
 Fairmont Preparatory Academy
 Saddleback Valley Christian High School
 Southland Christian High School
 Tarbut V' Torah

References

CIF Southern Section leagues